The Hollywood String Quartet (HSQ) was an American string quartet founded by violinist/conductor Felix Slatkin and his wife cellist Eleanor Aller. The Hollywood String Quartet is considered to be the first American-born and trained classical music chamber group to make an international impact, mainly through its landmark recordings. These recordings have long been regarded as among the most outstanding recorded performances of the string quartet repertoire.

History
The musicians of the Hollywood String Quartet were the leading players in the major movie studio orchestras producing the vibrant, lush film soundtracks during the "Golden Age of Hollywood". In 1939, the same year as their marriage, Felix Slatkin and Eleanor Aller formed the HSQ.

In its original formation, Slatkin and Aller were joined by violist Paul Robyn and second violinist Joachim Chassman. However, the group disbanded soon thereafter when the three male members enlisted in WWII service. The HSQ resumed its activities in 1947, with Paul Shure replacing Chassman as second violinist. In 1955, Paul Robyn left the group and Alvin Dinkin assumed the viola chair.

In addition to their work in the Hollywood studio orchestras and recording classical repertoire, the HSQ members regularly performed as session musicians at the major record companies, including Capitol Records. At Capitol, they accompanied some of the leading pop performers of the era, most notably Frank Sinatra, for whom Felix Slatkin acted as concertmaster and occasional conductor on his now iconic Capitol recordings during the 1950s. Among these recordings was the 1956 Close to You, which featured the HSQ accompanying Sinatra in arrangements by Nelson Riddle.

The HSQ officially disbanded in 1961. Slatkin died two years later at the age of 47.

The musicians
The musicians of the HSQ were all the progeny of Russian immigrants. All excelled musically in their youth and were formally trained at either the Juilliard School or the Curtis Institute of Music. The musicians were:

Felix Slatkin (1915-1963) Violin; Studied at Curtis with renowned violinist Efrem Zimbalist and conducting with Fritz Reiner; at age 15 was a member of the St. Louis Symphony under conductor Vladimir Golschmann; Concert Master of the 20th Century Fox Studio Orchestra (1937-1963) and the Capitol Records Sinatra recording sessions; conductor of the Concert Arts Orchestra and Hollywood Bowl Symphony Orchestra.

Eleanor Aller Slatkin (1917-1995) Cello; Studied at Juilliard with Felix Salmond; First cello with the Warner Bros. Studio Orchestra from 1939-1968 and with the 20th Century Fox Orchestra from 1972-1985.

Paul Shure (1921-2011) Second Violin; Studied at Curtis with Joseph Achron; youngest player in the Philadelphia Orchestra at age 18 under conductor Leopold Stokowski; Assistant Concertmaster at 20th Century Fox; left the HSQ in 1958 and shortly thereafter assumed a faculty position at the Oberlin Conservatory of Music; concertmaster of the Los Angeles Chamber Orchestra from 1972-1987 as well as other major west coast ensembles. After Shure's departure from the HSQ, Joseph Stepansky joined the Quartet for concert tours.

Paul Robyn (1908-1970) Viola; Studied at Juilliard with Joseph Fuchs, Samuel Gardner and Hans Letz; Violist with the Gordon String Quartet (1931-1935); Principal Violist at Warner Brothers; Left the HSQ in 1955; replaced by Alvin Dinkin.

Alvin Dinkin (1912-1970) Viola; Studied at Curtis with Louis Bailly; played in St. Louis Symphony and 20th Century Fox Orchestras with Felix Slatkin.

In addition, pianist Victor Aller (1905-1977) was featured on several HSQ recordings, including the acclaimed Brahms Piano Quartets and Piano Quintet. Aller, the brother of cellist Eleanor, studied at Juilliard under Josef Lhévinne. He had a long and distinguished career as a pianist in the film industry and manager of the Warner Bros. Studio Orchestra, and as a teacher and recording artist.

The HSQ sound
The Slatkins' elder son, conductor Leonard Slatkin, has observed that the similarities among musicians' backgrounds and music training impacts their technique and resulting sound as an ensemble: "With the Hollywood String Quartet, you had four people who basically had the same kind of training; four people who were more or less of the same age group and who approached music in almost identical ways."

The resulting sound has been acclaimed for its "remarkable transparency of texture ... this clarity was due in part to their excellent intonation and partly through their thorough preparation ... what set them above ... was their ability to combine warmth, color, and intensity with intellectual rigor, firm rhythm and an intuitive grasp of a work's architecture." Music critic and historian Alfred Frankenstein wrote after attending an HSQ concert: "This is a quartet to rank with the great international organizations in the field ... it has magnificent collective tone, a superb style that overlooks no fine detail but also sweeps through the major lines of a big work with almost symphonic vigor, and a general concept of music-making that is in tradition of the ensemble.

Five years later, a New York Times concert review echoed Frankenstein's comments: the HSQ produced a "luminous tone, whether in pianissimo or fortissimo ... at its best as in the Schubert work, which was played with incredible tonal nuance and expert musicianship, the Hollywood Quartet would have to be listed among the world's great chamber music ensembles."

Violinist Paul Shure has noted, "we made room for each other technically and soloistically-but the blend of sound was the main thing ... you draw the sound by your ability; the kind of vibrato you use, the way you apply pressure to the bow ... these are all very subtle techniques in string playing." Shure has also stated: "Dynamics were a very big part of our work. Our discussions were always about dynamics and a little bit about tempi, and nothing else. We played with vibrato except where there was a particular effect to be had-no dead left hands were allowed."

Cellist Eleanor Aller also commented: "Nothing was done without thought ... it was dependent on who the composer was, and the musical content ... just to play the notes is not making music." Aller has also stated that the group practiced every day for two years before its first public concert debut.

The classical recordings
From 1949–1958, the HSQ recorded a series of classical albums for Capitol Records; some of these recordings were re-released in boxed LP sets by EMI in the 1980s and in CD format by Testament Records during the 1990s. From their first recording of the then relatively unknown Villa Lobos String Quartet No. 6 to their Grammy-winning recordings of the Beethoven Late Quartets, the HSQ discography set a standard of excellence heralded by critics and embraced by the public. As stated by critic Richard Freed in discussing a 1982 EMI compilation release, "The Hollywood String Quartet may have been the finest such ensemble ever formed in this country ... each of these performances could serve as a sort of norm for the interpretation of the respective work. Both individual and ensemble playing are on the highest level, and the balance between subtlety and passion is quite remarkable; the Schubert in particular is a gem. EMI has done a beautiful job of remastering the recordings, which were state of the art for their time."

The recordings garnered similar enthusiasm upon their initial release. Commenting on record of compositions by Creston, Turina, and Wolf, Gramophone Magazines Lionel Salter wrote: "Once again the Hollywood Quartet shows what a masterly ensemble it is; I for one always look forward to its new records and have never yet been faced with a performance of less than the highest class. The tone of all the members is warm and well-balanced, they play with unshakable unaniminity [sic] and suppleness."

A complete classical discography is located at the end of this article. The discography includes a sampling of critical assessments. With the exception of the first record, the original recordings were produced by either Richard C. Jones or Robert E. Myers with engineering by John Palladino, Sherwood Hall III, Hugh Davies, or Carson Taylor (as noted). The CD reissues, released between 1993-1997, were remastered by Paul Bally at the Abbey Road Studios; Stewart Brown, Executive Producer.

The HSQ and modern repertoire
The HSQ repertoire included several contemporary compositions, including pieces that had not previously been recorded. Prior to the HSQ's 1950 recording, Arnold Schoenberg's Verklärte Nacht had only been released in a version for orchestra, although it was originally written for six instruments. Joined by Alvin Dinkin on second viola and Kurt Reher on second cello, the HSQ recording of the sextet in its original form was heralded by the composer, who wrote the original liner notes for the LP jacket. In a taped interview years later, cellist Eleanor Aller was visibly moved as she recalled receiving a photo inscribed by Schoenberg: "For the Hollywood String Quartet for playing my Verklärte Nacht with such subtle beauty."

In 1994, Gramophone Magazine inducted the CD re-issue of Verklärte Nacht, coupled with the Schubert String Quintet in C major into its Hall of Fame in the Historical Non-Vocal category. Gramophone Magazine stated that the recording was "unsurpassed...they have incomparable ensemble and blend; and their impeccable technical address and consummate tonal refinement silence criticism." Writing about a 1952 concert performance in San Francisco which he described as "epical", music historian Alfred Frankenstein said: "Perhaps the Schoenberg was the most important of the three pieces ... for it has seldom been presented here in its original form, as a chamber work for six musicians. In this version, it possesses a magical transparency and beauty of texture which are lost in the more familiar version for string orchestra, and none of its coloristic or expressive marvels was slighted in Sunday's performance."

The HSQ was the first to record the String Quartet in A Minor by Sir William Walton. At that time, the first recording of a work had to receive the composer's approval prior to release. In the first (unreleased) version recorded in November, 1949, the HSQ eliminated the repeat in the second movement; the musicians felt it detracted from the excitement of the composition. However, Walton did not concur with the change, resulting in a re-recording of the movement in August, 1950. The released version received the composer's enthusiastic endorsement: "I hope no one else ever records my Quartet again, because you captured so exactly what I had wanted". Walton's music publisher from Oxford University Press also wrote to violist Paul Robyn: "I felt I would like to add ... how much Dr. Walton and I enjoyed your playing of the very prominent viola part of this work. Would there not be a chance one day that you could play his Viola Concerto...?" However, Robyn never recorded Walton's Viola Concerto.

Similarly, composer Paul Creston responded to their 1953 recording of his String Quartet by writing to the album's producer Robert Myers: "I am tremendously pleased with the performance and reproduction of the work ... would you be so kind as to convey my deepest appreciation and gratitude to the Hollywood String Quartet for their splendid execution. Reports of their fine abilities had already reached me before I was fortunate enough to become acquainted with them, and I am delighted that they were chosen to permanently preserve my composition."

Close to You; recording with Sinatra
Another highlight of the HSQ's recording legacy is the 1956 Frank Sinatra album Close to You produced by Voyle Gilmore; a series of popular songs arranged by Nelson Riddle in an impressionistic blend of popular, classical and jazz influences. Close to You was a unique project, a scaled-down approach to popular music which remains among Sinatra's most enduring albums. The project was in part the product of Frank Sinatra's close professional and personal friendship with Felix and Eleanor Slatkin.

In Sessions with Sinatra; Frank Sinatra and the Art of Recording, Sinatra historian Chuck Granata observes "In Slatkin, Sinatra found a kindred spirit, as the violinist's immaculate playing paralleled what Sinatra sought to achieve with his voice; serious listeners will note many similarities comparing Sinatra's and Slatkin's individual approaches to musical interpretation. One hallmark of the HSQ was its long, smooth phrasing which was accomplished through controlled bowing techniques; Sinatra utilized breath control to realize the same effect. Likewise where Felix would frequently add slight upward portamento to a critical note and neatly strike an emotional chord, the singer would often inflect a note upward or downward or seamlessly glide from one key to another."

Granata observes that the concept behind Close to You was "...extremely progressive by the standard of its day." He further concludes that "from a thematic standpoint, of all the Sinatra LPs of his 'golden era,' Close to You comes closest to perfection."

Touring
The HSQ toured in the United States seven times, and visited Canada and New Zealand, but due to the musicians' extensive studio commitments, concerts were primarily performed in Southern California. However, the HSQ was the first American quartet to be invited to the Edinburgh Festival during a 1957 tour that also included appearances in Stockholm, Rome and the Royal Festival Hall  in London. A live recording of selections from the Royal Festival Hall performance was issued on CD form in 1996.

Honors and awards
The nascent National Academy of Recording Arts and Sciences (NARAS) initiated the Grammy Awards in 1958, toward the end of the HSQ's recording career. At the first Grammy ceremony, the HSQ recording of the Beethoven String Quartet No. 13 was awarded the Grammy for Best Classical Performance, Chamber Music (including Chamber Orchestra). Felix Slatkin was also a Trustee of the Los Angeles Chapter of NARAS.

In 1994, the Hollywood String Quartet won the prestigious Gramophone Magazine Award in the Historic Non-Vocal category for the Testament Records compact disc of Schoenberg’s Verklärte Nacht and Schubert’s Quintet in C Major.

In 1997, the Cannes Classical Award voted by an international panel of record reviewers honored the recording of the Late Beethoven Quartets and honored the Hollywood String Quartet with its Lifetime Achievement Award, accepted by Paul Shure, at the time the last surviving HSQ member.

Personal legacy
Eleanor and Felix Slatkin's two sons enjoy significant careers in music. Leonard Slatkin is a distinguished conductor and is music director of the Detroit Symphony and the Orchestre National de Lyon. Frederick Zlotkin (who adopted the original family surname) is the first cello of the New York City Ballet Orchestra and a member of the Lyric Piano Quintet.

The HSQ has no connection with the group which calls itself the New Hollywood String Quartet.

Discography

References

1939 establishments in California
1961 disestablishments in the United States
Musical groups established in 1939
Musical groups disestablished in 1961
American string quartets
Grammy Award winners